Arthur Boris Kolisnyk (August 17, 1921 – December 10, 1996) was a Canadian football player who played for the Winnipeg Blue Bombers and Regina Roughriders. He won the Grey Cup with Winnipeg in 1941.

References

1921 births
1996 deaths
Canadian football people from Winnipeg
Players of Canadian football from Manitoba
Canadian football running backs
Canadian football tackles
Manitoba Bisons football players
Winnipeg Blue Bombers players
Saskatchewan Roughriders players